The 1983 Austrian motorcycle Grand Prix was the sixth round of the 1983 Grand Prix motorcycle racing season. It took place on the weekend of 27–29 May 1983 at the Salzburgring.

Classification

500 cc

References

Austrian motorcycle Grand Prix
Austrian
Motorcycle Grand Prix
Austrian motorcycle Grand Prix